The 2018 BMW Open was a men's tennis tournament played on outdoor clay courts. It was the 103rd edition of the event, and part of the ATP World Tour 250 series of the 2018 ATP World Tour. It took place at the MTTC Iphitos complex in Munich, Germany, from 30 April until 6 May 2018.

Singles main draw entrants

Seeds

 Rankings are as of April 23, 2018.

Other entrants
The following players received wildcards into the main draw:
  Matthias Bachinger
  Yannick Hanfmann 
  Casper Ruud

The following players received entry as special exempts:
  Marco Cecchinato
  Yannick Maden

The following players received entry using a protected ranking:
  Andreas Haider-Maurer

The following players received entry from the qualifying draw:
  Dustin Brown 
  Marius Copil
  Martin Kližan
  Daniel Masur

Withdrawals
Before the tournament
  Andrey Rublev → replaced by  Mikhail Kukushkin

Retirements
  Dustin Brown

Doubles main draw entrants

Seeds

 Rankings are as of April 23, 2018.

Other entrants
The following pairs received wildcards into the doubles main draw:
  Matthias Bachinger /  Yannick Hanfmann 
  Jürgen Melzer /  Philipp Petzschner

The following pair received entry as alternates:
  Daniel Masur /  Rudolf Molleker

Withdrawals
Before the tournament
  Julian Knowle

Champions

Singles

  Alexander Zverev def.  Philipp Kohlschreiber, 6–3, 6–3

Doubles

  Ivan Dodig /  Rajeev Ram def.  Nikola Mektić /  Alexander Peya, 6–3, 7–5

References

External links
Official website